The pardessus de viole is the highest-pitched member of the viol family of instruments.  It is a bowed string instrument with either five or six strings and a fretted neck. The pardessus first appeared in the early 18th century, and was commonly played by women, particularly in French-speaking countries.

Description
The pardessus de viole is the smallest of the viol family. Its size is similar to the violin's, and its range is correspondingly similar. The strings are made of gut (like on any bowed string instrument until the 1970s) and the top string was tuned to g'', a fourth higher than the top string of the treble viol. Like the treble viol, the pardessus de viole was almost never used to play accompaniment chords, but was always a melody instrument. When played, it is played upright on the lap with a bow.

Unlike the treble viol and other viol instruments, the pardessus usually has only five strings. The five string pardessus is tuned in fifths and fourths (g, d', a', d'', g''), while six stringed pardessus are tuned like other viols in fourths with a third (g, c', e', a', d'', g'' or g, c', f', a', d'', g'').

History
The pardessus de viole was invented around the year 1700. Violins had begun emerging in Italy, and the pardessus was developed to allow people accustomed to viols to play violin music. With a sound more reminiscent of the viol to audiences unaccustomed to the sound of the violin, musicologist Annette Otterstedt has characterized the pardessus as a hybrid between viols and violins.

The pardessus was often played by women, as the method of holding the pardessus in one's lap was considered more lady-like than holding a violin on the shoulder. The pardessus was most popular in French-speaking countries, but by 1770 it was starting to disappear from the landscape as viols generally were being eclipsed by the louder stringed instruments of the violin family.

References

External links 
 Tina Chancey describing and playing a pardessus de viole
 Discussion of the pardessus, with a performance beginning at 17:05

Viol family instruments
Early musical instruments
Baroque instruments